The Trona Railway  is a  short-line railroad owned by Searles Valley Minerals. The TRC interchanges with the Lone Pine Subdivision of the Union Pacific Railroad (former Southern Pacific Transportation Company) at Searles, California.

History
The railroad was built by the American Trona Company in 1914, to serve the mining company's potash shipping to an interchange with the Southern Pacific Railroad. The company and its Trona Railway has had various subsequent owners, including American Potash & Chemical Corporation, Kerr-McGee Corporation, IMC Global, Sun Capital, LLC, before the current ownership of Searles Valley Minerals, Inc. On Dec. 27 2007, Karnavati Holdings, a subsidiary of Nirma Limited, acquired all of Searles Valley Minerals, Inc.

This unique system extended  eastwards into the Owlshead Mountains, was in use from 1924 to 1926, and was dismantled in the late 1930s.

Construction 

The idea of building a standard gauge railroad to replace mule-drawn wagons came from Stafford W. Austin, the receiver of the American Trona Corporation. The railroad would connect Searles Valley with a lower cost connection to the markets within the United States and to ocean ports for exports. On 27 September 1913 the wife of Joseph Hutchinson broke ground with an old fashioned plow, to start the construction of Trona Railroad. The work force of 400 included American, Chinese, Greek, Hindu, Mexican, Irish, Norwegian and Swedish workers. They finished the task within 6 months despite battling occasional sandstorms. The construction was event-free, apart from one runaway tank car down the track from Searles Station. This struck the construction train and derailed several cars without causing injuries. The construction of the  track was completed by end of March 1914, and the first excursion was conducted in May 1914.

Steam locomotives 

The operation began with two new oil-fired Baldwin 2-8-0 steam locomotives. The locomotives weighed 104 tonnes each and their boilers produced steam at 200 pounds pressure. When they were coupled together, they had a combined pulling capacity of 500 tons.

Passenger service 
In addition to carrying inbound fuel oil and outbound fertilizer and chemical products from the new chemical plants in Searles Valley, the Trona Railway also carried passengers to and from Trona. Regular passenger services continued until 1937. A self-propelled coach for pupils of Westend, South Trona and Borosolvay to attend the school in Trona ran up to 1941. This coach was sold in 1941 to the California Western Railroad as their number M-200 for the Skunk Train from Willits, California, to Fort Bragg, California. It was sold to the Niles Canyon Railway in 1975.

World War I 
In 1914 Searles Lake was one of only two known potash deposits outside of Germany. By 1916 potash was transported via the Trona Railway to farmers, who needed fertilizer, to feed the nation during World War I.

Three Elephant Route 
The name Three Elephant Route was created, because many of the railroad's employees were British and did not understand, why the company should hang on to its heritage of 20 mule teams. As the story goes, they felt that three elephants could have done the job as well, if not better, than a herd of mules. The slogan was used as a brand and logo, which adorned Trona Railway equipment into the late 1940s.

Diesel locomotives 

In April 1949 the Trona Railway purchased two new Baldwin DT-6-6-2000 locomotives (numbered 50 and 51) to replace the three steam locomotives that were operating at the time. These weighed 180 tons each and had 2000 hp motors. These locomotives were unique in that they had center cabs, not the traditional cabs in the front. Locomotive No 52 was a smaller Baldwin AS 616 that only developed 1,600 hp. Eventually, two more AS 616 locomotives were added to the fleet to bring the total to five. A small diesel-electric locomotive called Dinky was used for switching in the rail yards. A crew car was used for safety inspections of the rail track and to bring employees to the site of track maintenance.

The Baldwins were sold in late 1992, replaced with six leased EMD SD45-2's, all painted in red and silver similar to the earlier Baldwins. These in turn were replaced in 2004 by the current fleet (as of February 2021) of seven EMD SD40-2 and EMD SD40T-2 locomotives, all of which remain in the faded color schemes of their former owners, Union Pacific and Southern Pacific. At least one EMD SW1200 switcher is also on the roster.

Operations 

The railroad handles 18,000 cars annually (1996 estimate). Commodities hauled include:
Sulfuric acid
Soda ash
Potash
Salt cake
Borax
Coal
Minerals
Material for the U.S. Naval Air Weapons Station China Lake

See also 
 United States Potash Railroad: a potash railroad in New Mexico

References

Bibliography

California railroads
Mining in California
Mining railways in the United States
Mojave Desert
Searles Valley
Transportation in San Bernardino County, California
Railway companies established in 1914
1914 establishments in California
Potash